Henri Joseph Guillaume Patin (21 August 1793, in Paris – 19 February 1876) was a French writer and translator of Ancient Greek and Latin.

Works 
 Mélanges de littérature ancienne et moderne (1840)
 Études sur les tragiques grecs, ou Examen critique d'Eschyle, de Sophocle et d'Euripide, précédé d'une histoire générale de la tragédie grecque (1841–43)
 Œuvres d'Horace (1866). Text online
 Études sur la poésie latine (1868–69)
 Discours et mélanges littéraires (1876)
 Odes d'Horace (1883). Text online
 Poètes moralistes de la Grèce : Hésiode, Théognis de Mégare, Callinos, Tyrtée, Mimnerme, Solon, Sémonide d'Amorgos, Phocylide, Pythagore, Aristote (1892)
 Lucretius. De la Nature (1893)

Writers from Paris
1793 births
1876 deaths
École Normale Supérieure alumni
19th-century French writers
Greek–French translators
Latin–French translators
French classical scholars
French male non-fiction writers
19th-century translators
19th-century French male writers